Ponomarikha is a rural locality (a village) in Ustretskoye Rural Settlement, Syamzhensky District, Vologda Oblast, Russia. The population was 27 as of 2002.

Geography 
Ponomarikha is located 23 km west of Syamzha (the district's administrative centre) by road. Ust-Reka is the nearest rural locality.

References 

Rural localities in Syamzhensky District